Artur Jorge Torres Gomes Araújo Amorim (born 1 January 1972), known as Artur Jorge, is a Portuguese football manager and former player who played as a central defender. He is the current manager of S.C. Braga.

As a player and manager, he was most associated with Braga, where he spent all but one season of his playing career and coached several of its teams, including two spells with the main squad.

Playing career
Born in Braga, Artur Jorge played mostly for hometown club S.C. Braga. He made his Primeira Liga debut on 29 November 1992, coming on as a late substitute in a 2–1 away win against C.F. Os Belenenses.

After 12 years at the Estádio 1º de Maio, the 33-year-old Artur Jorge retired at the end of the 2004–05 season with newly promoted F.C. Penafiel, contributing only 90 minutes to the team's midtable finish.

Coaching career
Artur Jorge began working as a manager with F.C. Famalicão, helping them to the third place in the play-offs of the fourth division, narrowly missing out on promotion. He subsequently worked with Braga's under-19s, who finished second and third in the junior championship during his tenure.

In early 2012, it was announced that Braga's reserve side would be revived and compete in the Segunda Liga as of the upcoming campaign. Shortly after, Artur Jorge was named head coach, achieving a 2–2 draw at S.L. Benfica B on his debut on 11 August. He quit on 16 October, having taken five points and no wins from nine games.

In July 2013, Artur Jorge was appointed at F.C. Tirsense. He returned to Braga's youths in 2017, and became first-team boss on 1 July 2020 when Custódio resigned with five games left of the season. He won 4–0 at home to C.D. Aves on his debut three days later, and secured third place with a 2–1 victory on the final day over champions FC Porto; he was named in charge of the under-23 side shortly after. 

Artur Jorge returned to Braga B on 16 June 2021. On 18 May 2022, he was reappointed at the helm of the main squad following the departure of Carlos Carvalhal.

Personal life
Artur Jorge's son, known by the same name, is also a footballer and a defender. He too played for Braga.

Managerial statistics

References

External links

1972 births
Living people
Sportspeople from Braga
Portuguese footballers
Association football defenders
Primeira Liga players
Segunda Divisão players
S.C. Braga B players
S.C. Braga players
F.C. Penafiel players
Portugal under-21 international footballers
Portuguese football managers
Primeira Liga managers
F.C. Famalicão managers
S.C. Braga managers